Luc Tselan Tsiene Etou (born June 4, 1994), also known as "Junior" Etou, is a Congolese basketball player for New Basket Brindisi of the Lega Basket Serie A.

Personal life
Etou was born in Pointe-Noire, Republic of Congo.

High school
From 2012 to 2013, Etou played for Bishop Denis J. O'Connell High School in Arlington, Virginia. 

A cousin of Oklahoma City Thunder forward Serge Ibaka, Etou ranked as Rivals.com's No. 142 national recruit in the Class of 2013, and No. 31 on ESPN's Top Recruits for Power Forwards in 2013. He held offers from Clemson, Kansas, Maryland, Miami (Fla.), Rutgers, Washington, West Virginia, and Xavier.

College career
He was signed by Rutgers University on May 1, 2013, and played for them for two years.  Etou began his collegiate career at Rutgers. As a sophomore, he averaged 7.4 points and 6.6 rebounds per game. 

Following his sophomore season, he transferred to Tulsa. He was named TU Athlete of the Week. Etou averaged 15 points and 7.9 rebounds per game as a senior, leading the team in both categories. He earned Second Team All-American Athletic Conference honors.

College statistics

|-
| style="text-align:left;"| 2013–14
| style="text-align:left;"| 
| 27 || 20 || 23.0 || .419 || .256 || .639 || 4.6 || 0.7 || 0.2 || 0.4 || 5.3
|-
| style="text-align:left;"| 2014–15
| style="text-align:left;"| 
| 31 || 31 || 29.6 || .391 || .311 || .662 || 6.6 || 0.6 || 0.4 || 0.4 || 7.4
|-
| style="text-align:left;"| 2016–17
| style="text-align:left;"| 
| 32 || 32 || 29.2 || .490 || .427 || .767 || 6.7 || 1.3 || 0.5 || 0.1 || 12.6
|-
| style="text-align:left;"| 2017–18
| style="text-align:left;"| 
| 31 || 31 || 30.4 || .466 || .350 || .715 || 7.9 || 1.5 || 0.5 || 0.3 || 15.0
|-

Professional career
Etou signed with the Turkish club Sakarya Büyükşehir Belediyesi S.K. on July 27, 2018.

On April 5, 2019, he signed with Movistar Estudiantes of the Spanish ACB.

On July 24, 2019, he signed with Cholet Basket of the French LNB Pro A.

On November 10, 2019, he signed with s.Oliver Würzburg of the German Basketball Bundesliga (BBL).

On August 16, 2020, Etou signed with UJAP Quimper 29 of the LNB Pro B.

On August 2, 2021, he signed with Hapoel Be'er Sheva of the Israeli Premier League.

On July 28, 2022, he has signed with New Basket Brindisi of the Lega Basket Serie A.

International career
Etou competed with the Republic of the Congo national basketball team at the 2009 African Championship, where he averaged 1.7 blocks per game, ranking second in the competition despite being the second youngest player at the tournament.

References

1994 births
Living people
Basketball players from Virginia
CB Estudiantes players
Cholet Basket players
Hapoel Be'er Sheva B.C. players
Liga ACB players
New Basket Brindisi players
People from Pointe-Noire
Power forwards (basketball)
Republic of the Congo men's basketball players
Rutgers Scarlet Knights men's basketball players
S.Oliver Würzburg players
Sakarya BB players
Sportspeople from Arlington County, Virginia
Tulsa Golden Hurricane men's basketball players
Republic of the Congo expatriate basketball people in the United States
Republic of the Congo expatriate basketball people in Spain
Republic of the Congo expatriate basketball people in Turkey
Republic of the Congo expatriate basketball people in Italy
Republic of the Congo expatriate basketball people in France
Republic of the Congo expatriate basketball people in Germany
Republic of the Congo expatriate basketball people in Israel